"Brand New Love" is a song by Lou Barlow.

Brand New Love may also refer to:
Brand New Love (album), a 2014 album by The Go Find
Brand New Love, a 1990 album by Jeff & Sheri Easter
"Brand New Love", a song by Rabbitt from Boys Will Be Boys
"Brand New Love (Take a Chance)", a song by Giorgio Moroder and Philip Oakey from Philip Oakey & Giorgio Moroder
"Brand New Love", a song by Serena Ryder from Serena Ryder